The  Crawford County Courthouse in Girard, Kansas is a Classical Revival-style courthouse built in 1922.  It was listed on the National Register of Historic Places in 2009.

The building is a three-story reinforced concrete building faced with stone, designed with Classical Revival symmetry, Tuscan columns, pilasters and pedimented entries. It was designed by architects Tonini and Bramblet.

It also included three non-contributing objects:  a Huey helicopter, a Vietnam War veteran's memorial, and a deer statue.

References

Government buildings on the National Register of Historic Places in Kansas
Neoclassical architecture in Kansas
Government buildings completed in 1922
Crawford County, Kansas